Yevhen Hutsalo (14 January 1937 – 4 July 1995 ) was a Ukrainian writer and journalist.

Biography
Hutsalo was born in Staryi Zhyvotiv, Vinnytsia oblast.  He graduated from the Nizhyn Pedagogical Institute in 1959, and was first published in 1960. During the 1960s, Hutsalo was considered one of the "shestydesyatnyky" (the sixtiers), or those who were opposed to the oppressive communist regime. However, later on he chose to be an official writer rather than one opposed to the regime.

He published over 25 novella and short-story collections (several of them for children), a trilogy of novels, and three poetry collections.  His works are noted for their detail, lyrical descriptions of nature, psychological portraits, and abundant use of the rural vernacular.

In 1985 Hutsalo was awarded the Shevchenko Prize and in 1994 the Antonovych prize.

In (Ukraine's capital) Kyiv a lane dedicated to Field Marshal of the Russian Empire Mikhail Kutuzov was renamed after Yevhen Hutsalo in 2016.

References

1937 births
1995 deaths
People from Vinnytsia Oblast
Ukrainian poets
Ukrainian male short story writers
Ukrainian short story writers
Recipients of the Shevchenko National Prize
20th-century poets
20th-century short story writers
Ukrainian children's writers
Ukrainian novelists
20th-century male writers
20th-century Ukrainian writers
20th-century Ukrainian journalists